The tennis competition during the 1995 Summer Universiade (also known as the XVIII Summer Universiade) took place in Fukuoka, Japan from August 24 till August 30, 1995.

Medal summary

Medal table

See also
 Tennis at the Summer Universiade

External links
Results

1995
Universiade
1995 Summer Universiade